The  is a fictional group of characters featured in Akira Toriyama's Dragon Ball anime and manga series. In the aftermath of the Red Ribbon Army's defeat by Goku, a surviving member known as Doctor Gero continues the group's legacy and creates a series of powerful artificial humanoids known as Androids as part of his vendetta against Goku.

The group was generally well received by reviewers. Commentators noted that the Red Ribbon Army arc, in which the group is presented as the first legitimate threat to Goku, represented a shift to a darker tone for the series, as well as a notable example of antiquated or politically incorrect attitudes towards real world stereotypes and tropes in Japanese anime. Some of the group's individual members, including the Red Ribbon Androids who appear as recurring villains in the franchise, have left a lasting impression in popular culture and specifically received commentary by media outlets.

Conception and creation
Dragon Ball series creator Akira Toriyama drew inspiration for the military organization, particularly its  base, from the video game Spartan X (known as Kung-Fu Master internationally), in which enemies tend to spawn at a rapid rate while the player character ascends a tower; the game itself was based on two Hong Kong martial arts films, Jackie Chan's Wheels on Meals (known as Spartan X in Japan) and Bruce Lee's Game of Death. Some of the Red Ribbon Army members wear uniforms reminiscent of the Hitler Youth, the youth organisation of the Nazi Party in Nazi Germany, albeit without their signature swastika armbands.

One of the group's major characters, is coded as a stereotypically homosexual character, and is similar in concept to the Sturmabteilung co-founder Ernst Röhm. Blue's Japanese voice actor, Toshio Furukawa claimed said it was a difficult role to play due to the character's sexuality.

Toriyama created Androids 17 and 18 after Kazuhiko Torishima, his former editor, expressed his disappointment with Androids 19 and 20 being depicted as the villains of the Android Saga arc. When Torishima complained about the youthful duo as well after they were incorporated into the story, Toriyama decided to develop and introduce Cell.

Members
The Red Ribbon Army's membership comprises humans, anthropomorphic animals, monsters, and robots. Its hierarchy is organized like a pyramid structure: its supreme leader is Commander Red, followed by his second in command and adjutant Staff Officer Black, who is in turn followed by commanding officers such as General Blue, and so on. Doctor Gero, creator of the Red Ribbon Androids and Cell, is the chief scientist of the Red Ribbon Army. The organization functions as a military dictatorship where orders from a superior officer are absolute, but each member may conduct themselves according to their respective ambitions.

Goku's protracted struggle with the Red Ribbon Army begins when he resumes his search for his Grandfather's Dragon Ball following the conclusion of a martial arts tournament he participated in. At the same time, Commander Red directs his forces to raid several settlements throughout the world in search for the Dragon Balls, ostensibly on a quest for world domination. Goku initially encounters and defeats  and his subordinates. Silver is later sentenced to death by Red for losing to a little boy. 

Though its leadership believe that Silver's defeat was an anomaly, Goku is increasingly seen as a genuine threat when he manages to defeat the forces under  in their northern stronghold known as Muscle Tower. General White's forces include the android brute , the ninja  and his four identical brothers, and the large extraterrestrial monster . A  and the  Corps are mentioned in passing, but are never seen. The Red Ribbon Army occasionally recruits hired help to further their objectives, such as the assassin Mercenary Tao, and the anime-exclusive thief .  

During the Commander Red Saga, Black eventually discovers that Red's motivation to obtain the Dragon Balls in a bid for world domination, is in fact a ruse; Red, an exceedingly short man, secretly covets the power of the Dragon Balls to wish himself taller. Black turns on Red and attempts to take command of the army and rename it the "Black Ribbon Army", only to be killed by Goku after he is able to wipe out most of the remaining Red Ribbon forces. Following the downfall of the organization, Doctor Gero continues his research and development work on his line of Android operatives to seek revenge against Goku.

General Blue
 is the titular villain of the General Blue Saga arc in the original Dragon Ball series. One of the Red Ribbon Army's leaders and seemingly its most powerful member, Blue has special telekinetic abilities that allow him to paralyze other individuals and can also be used to control objects. He is a neat freak, and when he does not enjoy Bulma's attempts at seduction, she states that he is gay. He manages to steal the Dragon Radar during their final encounter but after returning to the army's headquarters is set to be executed for not obtaining any of the Dragon Balls after multiple failures. He is allowed to fight the hitman Mercenary Tao to redeem himself, though Tao easily kills Blue using only his tongue. He is voiced by Toshio Furukawa in Japanese, and Sonny Strait in the Funimation dub.

Mercenary Tao 
, Mercenary Tao or General Tao in English anime dubs, is a hitman hired by the Red Ribbon Army to deal with Goku. He is first introduced in the series by being hired by the Red Ribbon Army to take out Goku and retrieve the Dragon Balls he possesses. He murders General Blue with only his tongue, slew Bora the guardian of Korin Tower with his own spear, and seemingly kills Goku. After succeeding in the initial battle and collects most of the Dragon Balls in Goku's possession, he where Goku challenges him again with his newfound power from Korin. He gets caught in the explosion of his own grenade and is assumed dead. Master Shen later enters his disciples Tien Shinhan and Chiaotzu in the 22nd World Martial Arts Tournament, and attempts to avenge his brother by ordering his disciples to hurt and kill Goku and Master Roshi's other students. It is later revealed that Tao survived and was modified into a cyborg using all the money he gained from his previous assassination jobs. He enters the 23rd World Martial Arts Tournament with the support of Master Shen, but is easily defeated by his brother's former student Tien Shinhan. In the anime Tao makes further appearances in filler episodes of Dragon Ball Z during its fifth season.

In Japanese, he is voiced by Chikao Ōtsuka in Dragon Ball and Yukimasa Kishino in Dragon Ball Z. In the Ocean dub, he is voiced by Scott McNeil, while in the Funimation dub, he is voiced by Kent Williams, who also voiced Dr. Gero.

Red Ribbon Androids

Android 8
 or Mechanical Man No. 8, is the first Red Ribbon Android operative seen in the series. Android 8 is seen towards the end of the original manga series, giving energy for Goku's Genki-Dama to destroy Majin Buu. An alternate future timeline counterpart of Android 8 makes a cameo appearance in Dragon Ball Super.

In the Dragon Ball anime, Android 8's creator is revealed to be Doctor Frappe (フラッペ博士, Furappe Hakase). Later supplementary material suggests that Frappe and Gero developed the Red Ribbon Androids together as colleagues.

Doctor Gero is voiced by Shōzō Iizuka in Japanese, Dale Wilson in the Ocean dub, and Mike McFarland in the Funimation dub.

Doctor Gero

 does not appear in the original Red Ribbon Army story arc, and is retroactively linked to the group when his motivation of revenge against Goku for the organization's downfall is revealed in the Android Saga arc. After creating a more advanced series of Red Ribbon Androids, he eventually implants his own brain into an exact replica of his body, and calls himself . He is initially encountered by Yamcha, who is nearly killed when Gero impales his chest with a hand and absorbs Yamcha's chi using a small device on his hand. Gero later flees back to his laboratory and release Androids 17 and 18 in order to fend off Goku's associates, but 17 turns on his creator and murders him following a brief altercation. 

Doctor Gero is voiced by Kōji Yada in Japanese, Brian Dobson in the Ocean dub, and Kent Williams in the Funimation dub, who also voiced Mercenary Tao.

Android 19
 is a round, pale fully mechanical android and the most loyal of Gero's creations. Like Gero's Android form, 19 is capable of absorbing the energy of others. During an attack on Goku and his associates, the Dragon Team, 19 successfully drains Goku of his energy while he is incapacitated by his heart virus condition, but is destroyed by Vegeta afterwards. Gero retreats back to his laboratory in response. 

Android 19 is voiced by Yukitoshi Hori in Japanese media, Cathy Weseluck in the Ocean dub, Phillip Wilburn in the Funimation dub, and Todd Haberkorn in the Dragon Ball Z Kai dub.

Android 17 and Android 18 

Androids 17 and 18 are originally a pair of twins who have been transformed by Gero's cybernetic enhancements. They are initially presented as antagonists against Goku's friends and associates. Cell would successfully absorb both 17 and 18, which leads to the events of the Cell Games Saga. Both Androids eventually reformed and lead normal lives following Cell's defeat.

In an alternate future timeline where Goku dies from a heart virus condition, 17 and 18 are depicted as sociopathic mass murderers who wiped out a majority of the Earth's population, including almost all members of the Dragon Team, but are eventually killed by Trunks.

Android 16
 is a large fully mechanical android modeled after Gero's son Gevo, a high-ranking soldier in the Red Ribbon Army who died from an enemy bullet in an undisclosed battle. 16 is deemed a failure by Gero, and is deactivated until Android 18 reactivates and releases him. 16 processes a sophisticated mechanism to sense and track power levels in real time, a feature both 17 and 18 lack. Unlike his Android companions, 16 does not take pleasure in fighting others, and is fully committed to follow his programmed orders: to search for and kill Goku. Despite his large and cold appearance, 16 is very gentle and friendly, similarly to Android 8. 16 also has an appreciation for humanity and nature, and views Cell as an evil that serves to destroy both. While trying to protect Android 17 and 18 from Cell, he is badly damaged, though Bulma and her father later repair him. After he is repaired, he temporarily set aside his orders to kill Goku to focus on the fight against Cell. Like 17 and 18, 16 was designed with the ability to self-destruct, but the device was removed when he was being repaired. This is made known only when 16 tries to destroy Cell using his self-destruction mechanism, with Cell retaliating and destroying him. However, his head and consciousness survive, but later is crushed by Cell, which pushes Gohan over the edge to unleash the Super Saiyan 2 form, the necessary power level to overcome Cell.

Android 16 is voiced by Hikaru Midorikawa in Japanese media, Scott McNeil in the Ocean dub, and Jeremy Inman in the Funimation dub.

Cell

Cell is Doctor Gero's ultimate creation, referred to as a "Bio-Android". He is designed to evolve into the "perfect" being. The creature is completed at a later date and unleashed by Gero's supercomputer, intended as a fail safe by collecting data in the background.

Gamma 1 & 2
They are conceived by the army as an even more powerful new series of androids, designed by Doctor Hedo according to his liking of superheroes. Despite their flamboyant, often ridiculous showmanship, they are powerful and dedicated fighters with a strong sense of justice, albeit misguided by their creators. They are supposed to be used as a pretense for the organization to paint themselves as heroic figures while they seek revenge against Goku. Each of them wield special ray guns in battle that unleash an array of powerful ki blasts.

Gamma 1 and Gamma 2 are respectively voiced by Hiroshi Kamiya and Mamoru Miyano in Japanese, and by Aleks Le and Zeno Robinson in English.

Red Pharmaceuticals
Following the deaths of Doctor Gero and Cell, a new reincarnation of the Red Ribbon Army was eventually formed, eager to seek revenge once more on Goku, whom unbeknownst to them is offworld. They concealed all their operations in a hidden base holographically protected in plain sight, using a pharmaceutical company as a front.

Magenta
 is the primary antagonist of Dragon Ball Super: Super Hero, being the son of the late Commander Red, he resembles the former. He is the presumed head of Red Pharmaceuticals, used as a front for the reformed Red Ribbon Army, where he serves as its new leader. He secretly plots, alongside his assistant Carmine and Doctor Hedo, to seek revenge upon Goku and his loved ones for annihilating his father's organization, under the claim that Capsule Corporation hosts evil aliens. He is confident about his plans, but like his father, becomes belligerent when faced with the notion of things not going his way. 

Magenta is voiced by Volcano Ōta in Japanese and Charles Martinet in English.

Doctor Hedo
, is the short, portly genius scientist who is the grandson of the notorious Doctor Gero, who works for the revived Red Ribbon Army under Magenta after breaking free from prison. Unlike his grandfather, he has little desire to carry on Gero's revenge upon Goku, and he has an obsession with superheroes, and seeks to create the ultimate superhero androids, while also desiring the research funds from the army. He is responsible for the creation of the army's secret weapon, an even more powerful variant of the original Cell, .  He has an expertise in biology and has a medical license, and is revealed to have injected himself with a serum that protects him from light shock injuries. He is accompanied by his insectoid robot, Hachimaru.

Doctor Hedo is voiced by Miyu Irino in Japanese and Zach Aguilar in English.

Carmine
 is the secondary antagonist of Dragon Ball Super: Super Hero, as he is the secretary of Red Pharmaceuticals and Magenta's loyal bodyguard and chauffeur. He has a large pompadour hairstyle and has a habit of combing it. He assists Magenta in rebuilding the Red Ribbon Army in secret and plotting their revenge against Goku and his friends and family. He is incredibly ruthless and cold-blooded in situations, as he enjoys tormenting his enemies and is willing to kidnap and kill children.

Carmine is voiced by Ryota Takeuchi in Japanese and Jason Marnocha in English.

In other media
Several key members of the Red Ribbon Army appear in the alternate-retelling film Dragon Ball: The Path to Power, where they are presented with different character designs. 

In the film Dragon Ball: Mystical Adventure, General Blue and Sergeant Metallic appear as soldiers in Emperor Chiaotzu's army; the former is murdered by Mercenary Tao in the same manner as the original source material.

Sergeant Major Purple and General Blue appear in the 1990s remake of the Dr. Slump anime, where they attempt to claim the Dragon Balls from Goku and Arale Norimaki.

The story of Trunks' alternate future timeline being ravaged by Androids 17 and 18 is depicted in the 1993 anime TV special Dragon Ball Z: The History of Trunks.

Doctor Gero's death at the hands of Android 17 is retold in the seventh Dragon Ball Z film, which features three of his other creations as antagonists: Androids 13, 14, and 15. Aside from multiple non-canonical licensed video game appearances, the three Androids do not appear in the original manga or anime TV series.

In Dragon Ball GT, Doctor Gero creates a replicant copy of Android 17 along with Doctor Myu in the afterlife, who later merges with the original Android 17 to become the villanous Super 17 (超１７号, Chō Jū Nana-Gō).

Members of the Red Ribbon Army and the later Red Ribbon Androids have appeared in numerous licensed Dragon Ball video games. A notable original character, created for the 2018 fighting game Dragon Ball FighterZ, is Android 21. Her backstory as a Red Ribbon Army researcher as well as her in-universe connection to both Doctor Gero and Android 16 have been subject to media coverage.

Promotion and merchandise
The Dragon Ball 30th Anniversary Super History Book, released in 2016, features concept art and sketches for various characters drawn from the series' history. Manga artist Masashi Kishimoto contributed a sketch featuring the Pirate Robot, a minor character from the General Blue Saga arc.

Reception
Carl Kimlinger of Anime News Network opined that the Red Ribbon army arc represented the Dragon Ball series at its peak in terms of its tone, a pleasant balance between "the frivolity of early Dragon Ball and the ponderous solemnity of Dragon Ball Z". He found the Red Ribbon Army to be effective villains, as it was first time Goku has faced "real bad guys", as opposed to "goofy Team Rocket-esque wannabes" like the Pilaf Gang. Kimlinger noted that the complete defeat of the Red Ribbon Army would have major implications for the franchise's narrative, as it sets the stage for the Android Saga storyline in Dragon Ball Z. Smith commented that the Red Ribbon Army storyline is indicative of a time period that predates the prevalence of the notion of political correctness in popular media, noting that the concept never gained significant traction in Japanese popular culture by contrast. In his view, some of the antiquated writing and character design for the Red Ribbon Army is "less of a light form of entertainment, and more a throwback '80s cultural artifact"; Smith formed the view that while the series never loses its anthropological or historical interest, storylines like the Red Ribbon Army arc may be challenging for viewers to "just turn your brain off and enjoy it straight". 

The individual members and associates of the Red Ribbon Army have received varied receptions. Uonuma Usui from Nobuhiro Watsuki's Rurouni Kenshin manga is modeled after Mercenary Tao; Watsuki stated that Tao made "a strong impression" on him as he was the first villain in the series to defeat Goku. Craig Elvy from Screen Rant said Android 8 is a minor but important influence in Goku's overall character development throughout the series, and drew a link between their interactions early in the series to Goku's consistently merciful attitude towards his enemies as an adult. Android 16 is considered to be the franchise's best villain by Brandon Zachary, who described the character in an article for Comic Book Resources (CBR) as a tragic figure who brings a somber side to the Dragon Ball universe. In a 2004 poll, Japanese fans voted Androids 17 and 18 as the 18th and 10th most popular character in the series respectively. Sheldon Pearce from Complex found both 17 and 18 to be interesting in their own right and gave them high rankings in his list of Dragon Ball Z characters. The fight between 17 and Piccolo is considered to be one of the greatest fights in Dragon Ball Z by David Dennis Jr. from Uproxx.

Conversely, Todd Douglass Jr. felt that collectively, the Red Ribbon Army characters were "hit or miss" for him. Aimee Hart, writing for Anime Feminist, was disturbed by an in-joke conveyed in the anime, which depicts Bulma breaking the fourth wall in an episode to imply that a scene of her being raped by a group of Red Ribbon Army soldiers is censored from publication in the original manga. Both Anthony Gramuglia, writing for CBR, and Aimee Hart considered the homophobic characterization of General Blue to be deeply problematic. Gramuglia is particularly critical of Blue's uniform being styled after that of an organization which  persecuted homosexual individuals, as well as the anime adaptation's depiction of Blue as a pedophile, which evokes an offensive stereotype of gay men being sexual predators.

References

Dragon Ball manga
 Entire series 
Toriyama, Akira. ドラゴンボール [Dragon Ball] (in Japanese). 42 vols. Tokyo: Shueisha, 1985–1995.
Toriyama, Akira. Dragon Ball. 16 vols. San Francisco: Viz Media, 2003–2004.
Toriyama, Akira. Dragon Ball Z''. 26 vols. San Francisco: Viz Media, 2003–2006.

Individual volumes

Sources

Anime and manga supervillains
Villains in animated television series
Dragon Ball characters
Fictional military organizations
Fictional terrorist organizations